Selu also known as Sailu is a city and a municipal council in Parbhani district in the Indian state of Maharashtra.

History
Selu is referred in many places as Sailu. Selu is a city full of prosperity and ancient culture. As per Parbhani district’s history, it goes back to the Stone Age. Researchers think the religions of the valley of the Godawari were progressive. As per researcher’s statement, today’s area under the Selu was included into an emperor Ashoka’s empire. After Mourya emperors decayed, this area was ruled by Satwahan, Rashtrakut, Wakatak, Devgiri’s Yadav, Mughals and Nizams. During the period of Yadav there was a Hemadri (Hemandpanti) architect whose architecture was considered as a sect of Hemand architecture. At Walur, Hatnur, Chikalthana, Kundi God Shiva’s temple was Hemand sect type of art. gohegaon gahininath temple.

Infrastructures
Selu is a big town with great infrastructures present in the city such as Colleges, Temples and Masjids.

Colleges/Schools: 

1.Nutan Vidhyalaya. 

2.New High School 

3.Zakir Hussain Primary and High School 

4.Modern English School 

5.Prince English School 

6.Yashwant School 

7.Yaser School 

8.Z.P School 

9.C.P.School.

10.bca college 

11.bordikar college of agriculture selu, 

12.Apurva polytechnic college, food technology shri ram pratishthan selu.

13. Nutan English School Selu.

14.
15.Nutan Mahavidhalaya 

BANKS:

1.SBI Main Branch 

2.SBI Market Area Branch 

3.HDFC 

4.ICICI 

5.DENA BANK 

6.SAIBABA BANK 

7.DEVGIRI BANK 

8.PDCC BANK 

9.MAHARASHTRA GRAMIN BANK.

10.ANDHRA BANK

11.POST BANK

12. dnyanaradha bank 

13. tulja bhavani bank, 

14. valmiki bank, 

15. mahesh co-operatie bank, 

16. selu nagri sahakari sanstha

17. anand nagri urban co credit society.

Geography
It has an average elevation of 415 metres (1361 feet).
It is located at 19°27 and 76°27. This city has progressed because of connectivity by road and railway track. Moregaon village is nearby this city and Dhudhana River flows by this village. Lower Dhudhana Project (dam) was sanctioned in 1979, near to Bramhawakadi village, which is now near completion.

Demographics
 India census, Selu has population of 46,915 of which 24,128 are males while 22,787 are females. Female Sex Ratio is of 944 higher than Maharashtra state average of 929.. In Selu, 13.42% of the population is under 6 years of age.

Literacy rate of Sailu city is 77.91% lower than state average of 82.34%. In Selu, Male literacy is around 84.74% while female literacy rate is 70.72%.

Schedule Caste (SC) constitutes 9.73% while Schedule Tribe (ST) were 2.30% of total population in Sailu.

Transportation

Rail
Selu is well connected by cites like Delhi, Bhopal, Amritsar, Agra, Parbhani, Aurangabad, Nanded, Nagpur, Mumbai, Hyderabad, Pune, Shirdi, Vijayawada. Selu Railway  (SELU) Station is on Mudkhed-Manmad Section of Nanded Division in SCR Zone. It is Big Station with amenities like ATVM Machine, 3 Platforms, Waiting Halls, Senior Section Engineers P.Way office. Spiced Chickpeas at the station are quite famous. Early in 2019 Railway board has given stoppage to Sachkhand Superfast Express at Selu railway station, which connects the city to nation's capital New Delhi.

Road
Selu is well connected to Maharashtra and rest of India. It is on national highway number 171. It is about 50 kilometers from Parabhani. It is well connected by road transport. Many buses from Aurangabad, Parbhani, Nanded, Jintur, Manwat, Pathri, Buldhana, Lonar, Jalna, and Partur come to Selu. Selu is connected by Government as well as private transport.

Governance
Municipal Council Selu is responsible for local administration and citizen services in city jurisdiction. Council has administrative and engineering wing. Sailu is a taluka place in Parbhani District. Earlier the Sailu taluka was attached with Pathri Constituency. As per the restructured constituencies, it is now attached with Jintur Vidhan Sabha Constituency.

The MLA of selu jintur is meghna sakore bordiker BJP

References

Talukas in Maharashtra
Cities and towns in Parbhani district

It is Birth place of Venku who was guru of Shirdi Sai baba Sai Baba of Shirdi